Anna Boghiguian (Cairo, 1946) is one of Egypt's foremost contemporary artists. Of Armenian origin, she has constantly moved between different cities across the globe, from Egypt to Canada and India to France. She studied political science at the American University in Cairo, Egypt, and Arts and Music at Concordia University in Montreal, Canada. The artist investigates subjects such as the history of the cotton trade, the salt trade and the life of Egyptian Greek poet Constantine P. Cavafy.

In 2017, she had solo exhibitions at Castello di Rivoli and Index—The Swedish Contemporary Art Foundation, Stockholm. She has been nominated for the 8th edition of the Artes Mundi award, one of the largest contemporary art prize in the UK.

Her works have been part of several international group exhibitions, including: 
 Centro dos de Mayo, Madrid (2016) 
 Van Abbemuseum, Eindhoven (2015) 
 The Armenian Pavilion at the Venice Biennial (2015) 
 Istanbul Biennial (2015) 
 New Museum, New York (2014)
 São Paulo Biennial (2014) 
 Documenta 13, Kassel (2012)

Her works are in the collections of: 
 MoMA, New York
 Guggenheim, Abu Dhab 
 The Art Institute of Chicago 
 Castello di Rivoli Museo d’Arte Contemporanea, Torino
 Van Abbemuseum, Eindhoven

References

1946 births
20th-century Egyptian artists
21st-century Egyptian artists
Living people
Egyptian people of Armenian descent